Millertown is a town in the Canadian province of Newfoundland and Labrador on the north-east side of Beothuk Lake. The town had a population of 87 in the Canada 2021 Census.

Millertown was founded in 1900 by Scottish lumber baron Lewis Miller.

Demographics 

References

External links
Millertown

Towns in Newfoundland and Labrador
Mining communities in Newfoundland and Labrador